Events from the year 1955 in Romania. The year saw the country join the United Nations and Warsaw Pact, the latter as a founder. Amongst notable people who died during the year was composer George Enescu.

Incumbents
President of the Provisional Presidium of the Republic: Petru Groza.
Prime Minister:
Gheorghe Gheorghiu-Dej (until 4 October).
Chivu Stoica (after 4 October).
General Secretary of the Romanian Communist Party:
Gheorghe Apostol (until 30 September).
Gheorghe Gheorghiu-Dej (after 30 September).

Events
 14 February – Dissident émigrés seize the Romanian embassy in Bern, Switzerland, in protest against the government. The group surrender after two days.
 14 May – The Warsaw Pact is signed with Romania a founding member.
 15 May – Following the signing of the Austrian State Treaty, Gheorghiu-Dej announced that Soviet troops would remain in Romania as long as foreign soldiers continue to be stationed in West Germany.
 23 August – During a visit by Soviet Premier Nikita Khrushchev, Gheorghiu-Dej proposes the withdrawal of Soviet troops. The request is not received favourably until 1958.
 14 December – Romania joins the United Nations.

Births
 18 January – Rodica Simion, mathematician (died 2000).
 31 January – Virginia Ruzici, tennis player, winner of the 1978 French Open. 
 14 April – Daniela Crăsnaru, poet.
 19 April – Agafia Constantin, sprint canoeist, winner of the gold medal at the 1984 Summer Olympics.
 4 May – Mihaela Runceanu, pop singer and vocal techniques teacher (died 1989).
 7 May – Florența Crăciunescu, winner of the bronze medal in the discuss at the 1984 Summer Olympics (died 2008).
 23 May – Preda Mihăilescu, mathematician.
 3 August – Renate Weber, lawyer, politician and first Romanian appointed as Chief of an EU Election Observation Mission.

Deaths
 15 January – Tit Liviu Chinezu, bishop of the Greek-Catholic Church, died in Sighet Prison (born 1904).
 6 February – Constantin Argetoianu, politician, Prime Minister in 1939, died in Sighet Prison (born 1871).
 4 May – George Enescu, composer (born 1881).
 5 March – Hortensia Papadat-Bengescu, novellist (born 1876).

References

Years of the 20th century in Romania
1955 in Romania
Romania
Romania